Marc García Renom (born 21 March 1988) is an Andorran footballer who plays for UE Engordany as a left-back.

Club career
Born in Andorra la Vella, García all but spent his entire career in the Spanish lower leagues. He started out at SE Eivissa-Ibiza B, representing in quick succession UD Fraga, UD Pomar, Atlético Monzón and UE Vic.

In June 2013, García signed with Segunda División B club UE Llagostera, being immediately loaned to Palamós CF and then to Cerdanyola del Vallès FC, both from Tercera División.

International career
García made his debut for Andorra on 29 May 2010, in a 4–0 friendly loss against Iceland.

References

External links

National team data

1988 births
Living people
People from Andorra la Vella
Andorran footballers
Association football defenders
Tercera División players
Tercera Federación players
Divisiones Regionales de Fútbol players
SE Eivissa-Ibiza B players
Atlético Monzón players
UE Costa Brava players
Palamós CF footballers
UE Rubí players
AEC Manlleu footballers
EC Granollers players
CF Montañesa players
UE Sant Andreu footballers
Primera Divisió players
UE Engordany players
Andorra international footballers
Andorran expatriate footballers
Expatriate footballers in Spain
Andorran expatriate sportspeople in Spain